Adelbert E. Bleekman, Sr., (March 26, 1846January 27, 1908) was an American lawyer and Republican politician.  He was a member of the Wisconsin State Senate (1874 & 1875) and State Assembly (1873), and served as district attorney of Monroe County, Wisconsin.

Early life and war service
Adelbert Bleekman was born on March 26, 1846, in Salisbury, Herkimer County, New York.  As a child, in 1850, he moved with his parents to Ohio, where he was raised and educated.

At age 18, he enlisted for service in the Union Army in the fourth year of the American Civil War.  He was enrolled as a private in Company A of the 2nd Ohio Cavalry Regiment and went to the front in the eastern theater of the war.  With his regiment, he participated in the bloody battles of Ulysses S. Grant's Overland Campaign, which culminated in the Siege of Petersburg in the Summer of 1864.  In June 1864, his regiment participated in the Wilson–Kautz Raid against Confederate railroad lines supplying Petersburg and Richmond.  During that fight, he was shot in the leg and severely wounded.  He was sent home to Wisconsin to recuperate and never returned to the fighting.  He officially mustered out in June 1865.

Legal and political career
Returning from the war, Bleekman resumed his education.  He studied at the academy at Little Falls, New York, then attended Albert College in Belleville, Ontario.  In 1869, he moved to Tomah, Wisconsin, where he taught school for two years while studying the law.  He was admitted to the bar in September 1870 and opened a law office in Tomah the following year.

He was active with the Republican Party of Wisconsin and was elected to the Wisconsin State Assembly in 1872, running on the Republican ticket.  In the 26th Wisconsin Legislature, he represented Monroe County's 2nd Assembly district, comprising roughly the eastern half of Monroe County.

In 1873, he was the Republican nominee for Wisconsin State Senate in the 4th Senate district—comprising Monroe and Vernon counties.  He was unopposed in the general election, and served a two year term.

He did not run for re-election in 1875, and moved to Sparta, Wisconsin, that year.  He continued his legal practice in Sparta, making a partnership with F. H. Bloomingdale known as Bleekman & Bloomingdale.  In 1876, he returned to politics and was elected district attorney of Monroe County, serving a two-year term.

Bleekman moved to La Crosse, Wisconsin, in 1886, where he remained for the rest of his life.

Personal life and family
Bleekman was the eldest of three sons born to Warren Bleekman and his first wife, Amanda ( Jacobs).  Bleekman's paternal grandfather, Ebenezer Bleekman, served in the War of 1812 and fought at the Second Battle of Sacket's Harbor.  His great-grandfather, Daniel Bleekman, was a Dutch American immigrant and served in the American Revolutionary War.

Adelbert Bleekman married twice.  His first wife was Eliza Farnham of Belleville, Ontario.  They had one son together before her death in April 1875.  The next year, Bleekman married Alice Bush of Tomah, Wisconsin.  With his second wife, Bleekman had three more children, though their first daughter died in infancy.

He was active throughout his life with the Grand Army of the Republic veterans organization, and was commander of the Sparta, Wisconsin, post in 1883 and 1884.  He was also a member of the Independent Order of Odd Fellows and the masons.

Adelbert Bleekman, Sr., died at his home in La Crosse on January 27, 1908, after six years of illness which had ended his legal career.

Electoral history

Wisconsin Assembly (1872)

| colspan="6" style="text-align:center;background-color: #e9e9e9;"| General Election, November 5, 1872

Wisconsin Senate (1873)

| colspan="6" style="text-align:center;background-color: #e9e9e9;"| General Election, November 4, 1873

References

 

1846 births
1908 deaths
People from Salisbury, Herkimer County, New York
People from Tomah, Wisconsin
Republican Party Wisconsin state senators
Republican Party members of the Wisconsin State Assembly
District attorneys in Wisconsin
People of Ohio in the American Civil War
Union Army soldiers
19th-century American politicians